White White World is a 2010 Serbian drama film directed by Oleg Novković. The film premiered at the 2010 Locarno Film Festival. Jasna Đuričić won Best Actress at the festival.

Cast 
 Uliks Fehmiu as Kralj
 Hana Selimović as Rosa
 Jasna Đuričić as Ruzica
 Nebojša Glogovac as Zlatan
 Boris Isaković as Beli
 Milica Mihajlović as Dara
 Marko Janketić as Tigar
 Meto Jovanovski as Crni
 Mira Banjac as Baba

References

External links 

Serbian drama films
2010 drama films
2010 films
Films set in Serbia
Films shot in Serbia